Maricunga Gold Mine is an open pit gold mine in Chile.  It is owned by Toronto-based Kinross Gold, but it has been closed since August 2016.

Geology
The Maricunga Gold Mine is located within the Maricunga Gold Belt of Chile. Poyrphyry gold mineralization occurs in the early Miocene (dated to 22 to 24 million years ago) Maricunga volcanic-intrusive complex.

Description 
In 1998 Kinross began operating the mine following a merger with Amax Gold (which changed its name to Kinam ), which held a 50% stake in the property, with the remainder coming with the 2007 purchase of Bema Gold Corporation. In 2010 Kinross announced completion of a feasibility study for a $290 million expansion project to the Maricunga mine, which would increase production by 10 million tons, and 90,000 ounces per year.

In August 2016, Kinross ceased operations at the Maricunga gold mine, resulting in a layoff of 300 employees. The decision to close the mine was the result of the Chilean government "shut[ing] down the water system linked to the operation over environmental concerns."

References

Further reading
 Webb, K. 2010. "Corporate Social Responsibility at Kinross Gold's Maricunga Mine in Chile: A Multiperspective Collaborative Case Study". Toronto, ON.

Gold mines in Chile
Surface mines in Chile
Mines in Atacama Region
Kinross Gold